Meriden may refer to:

Places

United Kingdom
Meriden, Hertfordshire, England, a suburb of Watford; see List of United Kingdom locations 
Meriden, West Midlands, England
Meriden (UK Parliament constituency), in the West Midlands

United States
Meriden, Connecticut
Meriden station, railway facility
Meriden Markham Municipal Airport
Meriden, Illinois
Meriden, Iowa
Meriden, Kansas
Meriden, New Hampshire
Meriden, West Virginia
Meriden, Wyoming
Meriden Township, Steele County, Minnesota

Other
Meriden (tribe), a subgroup of the Quinnipiac
Meriden School, an Anglican school for girls in Strathfield, New South Wales, Australia

See also
Meriden Gap, in the West Midlands of England